One ship of the United States Navy and one planned one have been named USS Hyman G. Rickover, after Admiral Hyman G. Rickover, known as the "Father of the Nuclear Navy".

 , was a  commissioned in 1984 and decommissioned in 2006
 , is a  under construction

United States Navy ship names